Kavrady  is a village in the southern state of Karnataka, India. It is located in the Kundapura taluk of Udupi district in Karnataka.

Demographics
As of 2001 India census, Kavrady had a population of 5105 with 2460 males and 2645 females.

See also
 Udupi
 Districts of Karnataka

References

External links
 http://Udupi.nic.in/

Villages in Udupi district